Pireneitega is a genus of funnel weavers first described by Kyukichi Kishida in 1955.

Species
 it contains thirty-five species:

Pireneitega armeniaca (Brignoli, 1978) – Turkey
Pireneitega bidens (Caporiacco, 1935) – Karakorum
Pireneitega burqinensis Zhao & Li, 2016 – China
Pireneitega cottarellii (Brignoli, 1978) – Turkey
Pireneitega fedotovi (Charitonov, 1946) – Uzbekistan
Pireneitega fuyunensis Zhao & Li, 2016 – China
Pireneitega garibaldii (Kritscher, 1969) – Italy
Pireneitega gongliuensis Zhao & Li, 2016 – China
Pireneitega huashanensis Zhao & Li, 2017 – China
Pireneitega huochengensis Zhao & Li, 2016 – China
Pireneitega involuta (Wang, Yin, Peng & Xie, 1990) – China
Pireneitega kovblyuki Zhang & Marusik, 2016 – Tajikistan
Pireneitega lini Zhao & Li, 2016 – China
Pireneitega liui Zhao & Li, 2016 – China
Pireneitega luctuosa (L. Koch, 1878) – Central Asia, China, Russia (Far East), Korea, Japan
Pireneitega luniformis (Zhu & Wang, 1994) – China
Pireneitega lushuiensis Zhao & Li, 2017 – China
Pireneitega major (Kroneberg, 1875) – Uzbekistan, Tajikistan, China
Pireneitega muratovi Zhang & Marusik, 2016 – Tajikistan
Pireneitega ovtchinnikovi Kovblyuk, Kastrygina, Marusik & Ponomarev, 2013 – Caucasus (Russia, Georgia)
Pireneitega pyrenaea (Simon, 1870) – Spain, France
Pireneitega ramitensis Zhang & Marusik, 2016 – Tajikistan
Pireneitega segestriformis (Dufour, 1820) – Spain, Andorra, France
Pireneitega spasskyi (Charitonov, 1946) – Caucasus (Russia, Georgia, Azerbaijan)
Pireneitega spinivulva (Simon, 1880) – Russia (Far East), China, Korea
Pireneitega taishanensis (Wang, Yin, Peng & Xie, 1990) – China
Pireneitega taiwanensis Wang & Ono, 1998 – Taiwan
Pireneitega tianchiensis (Wang, Yin, Peng & Xie, 1990) – China
Pireneitega tyurai Zhang & Marusik, 2016 – Tajikistan
Pireneitega wensuensis Zhao & Li, 2016 – China
Pireneitega wui Zhao & Li, 2016 – China
Pireneitega xinping Zhang, Zhu & Song, 2002 – China
Pireneitega xiyankouensis Zhao & Li, 2017 – China
Pireneitega yaoi Zhao & Li, 2016 – China
Pireneitega zonsteini Zhang & Marusik, 2016 – Tajikistan

References

External links

Agelenidae
Araneomorphae genera
Taxa named by Kyukichi Kishida